Lebap Region ( from the Persian  Lab-e āb) is one of the regions of Turkmenistan. It is in the northeast of the country, bordering Afghanistan, Uzbekistan along the Amu Darya. Its capital is Türkmenabat (formerly named Çärjew). It has an area of 93,727 square kilometers, and a population of 1,334,500 people (2005 est.).

The name Lebap is a Turkmenized form of the Persian Lab-e āb, which means "riverside" and has long been used to designate the middle reaches of the Amu Darya.

It contains the Repetek Nature Reserveas well as the Köýtendag Nature Reserve, which includes Turkmenistan's highest mountain, Aýrybaba (3137 meters).  Lebap is also home to the Dayahatyn caravansaray.

The region is located along the Amu Darya. The Kyzylkum Desert is located on the east side of the river and Karakum Desert is located on the west side of the river. About three-quarters of the region's land area is in the Karakum Desert.  The region's sunny weather and abundance of water resources help produce high-quality long-staple cotton.

History 

The region of present-day Lebap once occupied a spot along the Silk Road. The 9th-10th century caravansaray of Dayahatyn is located within Lebap.

Bukhara and Khiva khanates
Prior to the Russian Revolution, much of today's Lebap Region was part of either the Khanate of Bukhara or the Khanate of Khiva. The last khan of Bukhara, Sayyid Mir Muhammad Alim Khan,  nominally submitted to Soviet authority, but in reality joined the Basmachi movement and rebelled against the Bolsheviks. He fled in 1920, and the area was declared a people's republic until Soviet power was firmly established in 1924.  In that same year, the settlements at Çärjew and Kerki were formally assigned to the Turkmen Soviet Socialist Republic, along with the western parts of the Khiva khanate along the Amu Darya.

Recent history
On April 27, 2020, the region was hit by a severe windstorm. RadioFreeEurope/RadioLiberty alleged that the storm disrupted much of the region's electrical grid, public water supplies, natural gas connections, cell service, and internet connection. A local human rights website, Turkmen.news, reported that many people were admitted to the regional hospital in Türkmenabat after suffering injuries. They also alleged that there was sporadic looting in the storm's aftermath and that food prices in the region rose as a result of the storm. Local Turkmen media reported 10 deaths resulting from the storm, while Turkmen.news suggested that the true death toll was likely in the dozens, and dozens remained unaccounted for in the storm's aftermath. The rights group Human Rights Watch condemned what it perceived as "censorship" by local officials following the storm, noting that one group alleged that local police were watching out for people filming the storm's damage, and another group reported that dozens of people were detained for allegedly sending videos "abroad".

In December 2020, RadioFreeEurope/RadioLiberty reported that regional officials threatened to cut off the region's population from subsidized food if they were not up to date on their utility bills. The agency reported that many in the region received seasonal income from farming, and often did not earn money in the winter, and such matters were complicated by a decrease in remittances to the region as a result of the economic fallout from COVID-19.

Administrative divisions
As of 2021, according to the official website of the regional government, Lebap Region included one city with status equivalent to a district, 10 districts, 14 cities "in the district", 24 towns, 105 rural councils, and 429 villages.

Districts 
As of 9 November 2022 Lebap Region is subdivided into eight districts (etrap, plural etraplar):

 Çarjew (formerly Serdarabat)
 Darganata (formerly Birata)
 Dänew (formerly Galkynyş)
 Halaç
 Hojambaz
 Kerki (formerly Atamyrat)
 Köýtendag (formerly Çarşaňňy)
 Saýat

In November 2017 four districts, (Beýik Türkmenbaşy, Garaşsyzlyk, Garabekwül, and Sakar), were abolished and their territories absorbed by other districts. In November 2022 another two districts, Döwletli and Farap, were similarly abolished.

Municipalities 

As of January 1, 2017, the region included 15 cities, 23 towns, 106 rural or village councils, and 430 villages (or ).

In the list below, the lone city with "district status" is bolded:
 Dänew (formerly Galkynyş)
 Darganata (formerly Birata)
 Dostluk (formerly Yuzhnyy)
 Farap
 Garabekewül
 Gazojak
 Halaç
 Hojambaz
 Kerki (formerly Atamyrat)
 Köýtendag (formerly Çarşaňňy)
 Magdanly (formerly Gowurdak) 
 Sakar
 Saýat
 Seýdi (formerly Neftezavodsk)
 Türkmenabat (formerly Çärjew)

Economy

Agriculture
Crop production in Lebap is heavily dependent on irrigation from the Amu Darya. Fields are cultivated when one-and-a-half to two meters above the floodplains of the river, primarily cereal grains and cotton.

Extraction industries
Lebap is rich in various natural resources, most notably, natural gas. The region is home to the Malai Gas Field and the Bagtyýarlyk Gas Field, which both serve as major suppliers of natural gas to China.  

The Garlyk Mining and Enrichment Amalgamate in Köýtendag District produces potash fertilizer, and the Seýdi Oil Refinery is one of two petroleum refineries in Turkmenistan.

From antiquity, local residents quarried sulfur, zinc and lead in the Köýtendag (Kungitang) foothills for domestic needs, including casting of bullets. During the Soviet period, a lead mine was dug and the town of Svintsovyy Rudnik was founded.

Construction materials
The Lebap Cement Plant in Turkmenabat has a design capacity of one million tons per year. Polimeks built it in 2012. In 2020, construction of a second plant, in Köýtendag District, also with a design capacity of one million tons, got underway.

Power generation
The Zerger power plant under construction by Sumitomo, Mitsubishi, Hitachi, and Rönesans Holding in Çärjew District will have a design capacity of 432 megawatts. It is primarily intended for export of electricity.  The Zerger plant will use natural gas from the Üçajy Gas Field, delivered via a 125-km high-pressure pipeline.

Nature preserves and reservations
Amudarya State Nature Reserve
Köýtendag Nature Reserve
Repetek Biosphere State Reserve

Tourist attractions
Aýrybaba
Dayahatyn caravansaray (in use 9th to 16th centuries)
Dinosaur plateau

See also 
 OpenStreetMap Wiki: Lebap Province
 OpenStreetMap Wiki: Districts in Turkmenistan

References

 
Regions of Turkmenistan